Braeside, meaning hillside in the Scots language, may refer to:
Braeside, Aberdeen, Scotland
Braeside, Greenock, Scotland
Braeside, Victoria, Australia
Braeside, Ontario, Canada
Braeside Observatory, Flagstaff, Arizona
Breaside, Chicago, Illinois
Braeside, Calgary, a neighbourhood in Calgary, Alberta, Canada
Braeside Homestead, a heritage-listed homestead in Queensland, Australia
The Edith Marion Patch House, a historic building in Old Town, Maine
A district of Harare, Zimbabwe